ECHO IV, or ECHO 4 (Electronic Computing Home Operator, or Electronic Computer for Home Operation) is a prototype of a home computer developed by Westinghouse Electric engineer James (Jim) Sutherland in the mid 1960s (1965-1966).

History 
James Sutherland worked as an engineer for the American company Westinghouse Electric, designing fossil and nuclear power plant control systems. In 1959 the company built a computer called PRODAC IV (he was the designer of the arithmetic logic unit), using destructive-readout core memory and NOR logic. 

When PRODAC IV was replaced by a UNIVAC design, some of the Westinghouse controller hardware was declared surplus in 1965. Sutherland took up surplus boards and memory to build a home computer, ECHO IV (the "IV" in ECHO IV came from the PRODAC IV). It was made public for the first time in 1966.

The computer was working in the Sutherland's house until 1976, and was donated to the Computer Museum in Boston in 1984.

Technical specifications 
 Processor
 Transistorized (2N404), with RTL NOR logic elements
 120 circuit modules
 18 commands
 4 registers
 Add time: 216 μs
 Frequency: 160 kHz
 Main memory:
 8,192 15-bit words, magnetic core
 Input/Output:
 paper tape reader and punch
 keyboard made from parts of IBM Selectric typewriter
 Kleinschmidt teleprinter
 Physical specifications:
 Four large wooden cabinets, each with approximate dimension of:
 Width: 4 feet
 Height: 6 feet
 Depth: 2 feet
 Weight: about

Uses 
 Accounting
 Household inventory
 Calendar
 Manage all digital clocks through the house
 Real-time clock with delay of 1 second
 Air conditioning management
 TV and television antenna management; on school nights children were required to answer questions if they wanted to watch television
 Meteorological program for reading and storing data from a meteorological station that was connected to ECHO IV and weather forecast

References

Bibliography

External links 
ECHO IV photos with description: 

Home computers
Pages with unreviewed translations
Early microcomputers
Computer-related introductions in 1966